Polaris Motor srl was an Italian aircraft manufacturer based in Gubbio. The company specialized in the design and manufacture of ultralight trikes and was known for its inflatable boat trikes.

One of the company's first products, introduced in the early 1980s, was the Skin, a conventional land trike that remained in production though 2013. The FIB ("Flying Inflatable Boat") established the company's reputation in pure flying boat form and in its AM-FIB amphibious form.

The company carried out continuous development of its boat hulled aircraft, including refining the boat hull shape over time to improve performance on the water and in the air.

By 2014 the company website was listed as "under construction" and then was taken down, and the company was out of business.

The company's product line is now produced by New Polaris 2020 S.L. of Tenerife, Canary Islands, Spain.

Aircraft

See also

List of Italian companies

References

External links

Defunct aircraft manufacturers of Italy
Ultralight trikes